Zeljko Babic, also known as Sean Babic (born 3 April 1976) is a former association football player in the now defunct National Soccer League in Australia. He represented Australia in two senior games.

References

1976 births
Living people

Australian soccer players
Australian expatriate soccer players
Australia international soccer players
National Soccer League (Australia) players
Sydney United 58 FC players
Bankstown City FC players
Place of birth missing (living people)
Marconi Stallions FC players
Wollongong Wolves FC players
FK Borac Banja Luka players
Association football forwards